The women's 4 × 400 metres relay at the 2012 IAAF World Indoor Championships will be held at the Ataköy Athletics Arena on 11 March.Perri Shakes-Drayton held off individual champion Sanya Richards-Ross to claim Great Britain's first ever medal in this event. Ukraine originally finished fourth, but were later disqualified as their first leg runner (Bryzhina) inadvertently knocked Hanna Tashpulatava (Belarus) to the ground.

Medalists

Records

Schedule

Results

Final
Started at 16:40.

References

Relay 4x400 metres
4 × 400 metres relay at the World Athletics Indoor Championships
2012 in women's athletics